Diarsia esurialis is a moth of the family Noctuidae. It is found from Alaska and British Columbia, south to Washington, Oregon and California.

It is abundant in wet coastal forests.

The wingspan is about 33 mm. Adults are on wing in midsummer.

The larvae feed on the foliage of Corylus and Alnus.

External links
California moth species list
Bug Guide
Macromoths of Northwest Forests and Woodlands

Diarsia
Moths of North America
Moths described in 1881